Adelastes is a genus of frogs in the family Microhylidae. It is the only genus in the subfamily  Adelastinae and is also itself monotypic, being represented by the single species, Adelastes hylonomos, commonly known as the Neblina frog.

It is found in Venezuela and possibly Brazil.
Its natural habitat is subtropical or tropical moist lowland forests.
It is threatened by habitat loss.

Sources

Microhylidae
Amphibians described in 1986
Taxa named by Richard G. Zweifel
Taxonomy articles created by Polbot
Monotypic amphibian genera